AN/TPS-70 is a mobile rotating S band phased array 3D radar produced by Westinghouse (Northrop Grumman). It is the successor of the AN/TPS-43. The TPS-70 tactical radar provides reliability, sensitivity, and accuracy, even in the face of jamming and high-clutter conditions. It is being replaced by newer systems, but is still in service all around the world.

Operators 

 United States
 United Arab Emirates
 Serbia
 Switzerland : TAFLIR
 Australia
 Canada
 Colombia
 Germany
 Greece
 Iran
 Israel
 Jordan
 Mexico
 Morocco
 Pakistan
 South Korea
 Spain
 Thailand

References

Military radars of the United States